The Allegheny County Workhouse was a prison that was located adjacent to the town of Blawnox, Pennsylvania. Its full name was "Allegheny County Workhouse and Inebriate Asylum". The first inmates were received in 1869, and the facility closed in 1971.

The prison housed mostly inmates convicted of minor offenses. Many of those prisoners maintained a farm of about 1100 acres (445 ha), which contained apple orchards as well as many other crops and many different types of farm animals.

References 

Defunct prisons in Pennsylvania
Buildings and structures in Allegheny County, Pennsylvania
1869 establishments in Pennsylvania
1971 disestablishments in Pennsylvania